Storfors Municipality (Storfors kommun)  is a municipality in Värmland County in west central Sweden. Its seat is located in the town of Storfors, which has approximately 2,500 inhabitants.

The first local government unit named Storfors was created in 1950 when a market town (köping) by that name was detached from Kroppa. (The rest of Kroppa is since 1971 in Filipstad Municipality.) In 1967 Ullvättern was amalgamated with Storfors, making up the present municipal territory.

Storfors is one of Sweden's least populated municipalities. The nearest city is Karlstad, approximately 50 kilometers to the west.

Several small lakes and streams offer fishing opportunities. The countryside is also suitable for other outdoor activities, including walking and hiking.

See also
Alkvettern Manor, 17th century

References

External links
 
Storfors Municipality - Official site

Municipalities of Värmland County
Storfors Municipality